Owanka is an unincorporated community in Murray Township, Murray County, Minnesota, United States.

Notes

Unincorporated communities in Murray County, Minnesota
Unincorporated communities in Minnesota